Jovan Kokir (born 25 April 2000) is a Serbian professional footballer who plays as a winger for RFK Novi Sad.

Club career

Partizan
Kokir signed his first professional contract with Partizan on 1 September 2017, alongside Jovan Vlalukin, Svetozar Marković and Andrej Ilić. He was officially promoted to the senior squad the following year, being assigned the number 40 shirt.

Loan to Teleoptik
In early 2019, Kokir was loaned to Teleoptik until the end of the season.

Vojvodina
In summer 2019, Kokir signed a three-year-deal with Vojvodina.

International career
Kokir was selected by Perica Ognjenović to represent Serbia at the 2017 UEFA European Under-17 Championship.

Career statistics

Honours
Vojvodina
Serbian Cup: 2019–20

Notes

References

External links
 
 

Association football midfielders
FK Partizan players
FK Teleoptik players
FK Vojvodina players
FK Metalac Gornji Milanovac players
OFK Žarkovo players
Footballers from Belgrade
Serbia youth international footballers
Serbian First League players
Serbian SuperLiga players
Serbian footballers
2000 births
Living people